The 2022–23 Basketball Cup, also known as the Dutch Basketball Cup, was the 55th season of the Netherlands' national basketball cup tournament. The preliminary rounds began on 3 September 2022, while the first round began on 22 October 2022. The season ended with the final on 12 March 2023 in the Landstede Sportcentrum.

Donar was the defending title holder, having won the 2021–22 season. ZZ Leiden won their fourth Cup title after winning the final over Landstede Hammers, who lost their record fifth Cup final.

Bracket 
The Den Helder Suns withdrew in the eight-finals because it was unable to field a team due to injuries. The draw for the quarter-finals was held on 13 December 2022 and the final was played on 12 March 2023. The venue of the final was Landstede Sportcentrum, after another draw was held to determine this.

Final

References 

NBB Cup
2022–23 in Dutch basketball